Mary Fiennes (1495–1531) was an English courtier. She was the wife of Henry Norris. Norris was executed for treason as one of the alleged lovers of her cousin, Anne Boleyn, the second wife of King Henry VIII of England. Mary lived for six years at the French court as a Maid of Honour to queens consort Mary Tudor, wife of Louis XII; and Claude of France, wife of Francis I.

Family and early years 
Mary was born at Herstmonceux Castle in Sussex in 1495, the only daughter of Thomas Fiennes, 8th Baron Dacre and Anne Bourchier. By both her father and mother she was descended from Edward III. She had two younger brothers, Sir Thomas and John. Her mother was an elder half-sister of Elizabeth Howard and Lord Edmund Howard, making queen consorts Anne Boleyn and Catherine Howard a cousin of Mary. Her paternal grandmother, Alice FitzHugh, was sister to Elizabeth FitzHugh, grandmother of Catherine Parr, making her cousin to yet another queen consort of Henry VIII.

In 1514, Mary was appointed a Maid of Honour to Princess Mary Tudor and accompanied her to France when the latter married King Louis XII of France; afterwards she served in the capacity to Queen Mary's successor, Queen Claude, consort of the new king Francis I of France. Among her fellow Maids of Honour were her cousins, Mary (a mistress of Henry VIII) and Anne Boleyn.

Marriage and issue 
In 1520 upon her return to England, she married the courtier Henry Norris (1482 – 17 May 1536) of Yattendon in Berkshire, whom she had met that same year at the Field of the Cloth of Gold in France.
Norris served King Henry VIII of England as a Gentleman of the Bedchamber, and was held in high favour by the King. He was later appointed Groom of the Stool and continued to enjoy the King's favour. According to biographer Eric Ives, Norris was "perhaps the nearest thing Henry had to a friend." Norris had control of King Henry's Privy chamber.

Henry and Mary had three children:
 Edward Norris (died 1529)
 Henry Norris, 1st Baron Norreys ( – 1601), married Margaret Williams of Rycote, by whom he had issue.
 Mary Norris, married firstly Sir George Carew, and secondly Sir Arthur Champernowne, by whom she had issue.

Death 
Mary died in 1531, a year after her mother. Five years later her husband was attainted and executed for treason as one of the five alleged lovers of her cousin Queen Anne Boleyn, who herself was beheaded at the Tower of London on 19 May 1536.

Their four orphaned children were raised by Norris's brother Sir John Norris.

Ancestry

References 

Mary
British maids of honour
1495 births
1531 deaths
Daughters of barons
16th-century English women
English ladies-in-waiting
15th-century English women
15th-century English people
Norris family
People from Herstmonceux
People from Yattendon
Court of Francis I of France